Mărgineni may refer to one of several places in Romania:

 Mărgineni, Bacău, a commune in Bacău County
 Mărgineni, Neamț, a commune in Neamţ County
 Mărgineni, a village in Săliştea Commune, Alba County
 Mărgineni, a village in Hârseni Commune, Braşov County
 Mărgineni, a village in Valea Mare Commune, Vâlcea County